Inal is both a given name and a surname. In the Turkish context the name Inal is a product of an onomastic-hygiene movement initiated following the formation of the Turkish Republic to replace Arabic name Emin with which it shares common meaning, ‘to believe.’ 

Notable people with the name include:

Given name
 İnal Batu (1936-2013), Turkish diplomat and politician
 Inal Dzhioyev (born 1969), Russian footballer
 Inal Getigezhev (born 1987), Russian footballer
 Inal Pukhayev (born 1992), Russian footballer

Surname
 Sayf ad-Din Inal (1381-1461), Burji Sultan of Egypt reigned 1453–1461
 Ibrahim Inal (died 1060), Seljuk warlord
 Bülent İnal (born 1973), Turkish actor

References

Turkish-language surnames